This article is about the particular significance of the year 1904 to Wales and its people.

Incumbents

Archdruid of the National Eisteddfod of Wales – Hwfa Môn

Lord Lieutenant of Anglesey – Sir Richard Henry Williams-Bulkeley, 12th Baronet  
Lord Lieutenant of Brecknockshire – Joseph Bailey, 1st Baron Glanusk
Lord Lieutenant of Caernarvonshire – John Ernest Greaves
Lord Lieutenant of Cardiganshire – Herbert Davies-Evans
Lord Lieutenant of Carmarthenshire – Sir James Williams-Drummond, 4th Baronet
Lord Lieutenant of Denbighshire – William Cornwallis-West    
Lord Lieutenant of Flintshire – Hugh Robert Hughes 
Lord Lieutenant of Glamorgan – Robert Windsor-Clive, 1st Earl of Plymouth
Lord Lieutenant of Merionethshire – W. R. M. Wynne 
Lord Lieutenant of Monmouthshire – Godfrey Morgan, 1st Viscount Tredegar
Lord Lieutenant of Montgomeryshire – Sir Herbert Williams-Wynn, 7th Baronet 
Lord Lieutenant of Pembrokeshire – Frederick Campbell, 3rd Earl Cawdor
Lord Lieutenant of Radnorshire – Powlett Milbank

Bishop of Bangor – Watkin Williams 
Bishop of Llandaff – Richard Lewis
Bishop of St Asaph – A. G. Edwards (later Archbishop of Wales) 
Bishop of St Davids – John Owen

Events
January - Opening of Llanelli North Dock.
5 January - Opening of Tanat Valley Light Railway between Llynclys and Llangynog.
February - Beginning of the 1904–1905 Welsh revival in religion.
4 May - Charles Rolls and Henry Royce meet for the first time in Manchester to agree production of Rolls-Royce motor cars.
31 May - Wentwood Reservoir inaugurated for Newport Corporation.
26 May - Harvey du Cros junior makes the first successful ascent of Snowdon by automobile.
11 June - Henry Paget, 5th Marquess of Anglesey, is declared bankrupt; from 29 July sales of his assets at Plas Newydd (Anglesey) begin.
21 July - Edward VII and Queen Alexandra open the Elan Valley Reservoirs.
3 August - The first Royal Welsh Show is held at Aberystwyth.
September - The second Pan-Celtic Congress is held at Caernarfon.
28–29 September - A conference at Blaenannerch reinforces the strength of the religious revival.
October - Evan Roberts begins preaching.
c. October - Mrs H. Millicent McKenzie is appointed Associated Professor of Education at the University College of South Wales and Monmouthshire in Cardiff, the first woman in Britain to hold a professorial title.
3 October - Five people are killed in a railway accident near Loughor.
31 October - Rhondda Tramways Company begins operation.
November - Joseph Jenkins, instigator of the religious revival, is guest preacher at meetings in Bethany, Ammanford, and "converts" incumbent minister Nantlais Williams.
In local authority elections, the Liberal Party win control of all county councils in Wales.
Orthopaedic surgeon Robert Jones becomes Honorary Surgeon to the Baschurch Home in Shropshire which he will develop into the world's first specialized orthopaedic hospital.
Thomas Marchant Williams is knighted in recognition of his role in founding the National Eisteddfod Society.
No. 1 blast furnace at the old Blaenavon Ironworks is shut down.

Arts and literature
February - Gwen John arrives in Paris, in the company of Dorelia McNeill.

Awards
National Eisteddfod of Wales - held in Rhyl
Chair - J. Machreth Rees, "Geraint ac Enid"
Crown - Richard Machno Humphreys

New books

English language
Joseph Bradney - A History of Monmouthshire from the Coming of the Normans into Wales down to the Present Time, vol. 1

Welsh language
Owen Dafydd (died c. 1814) - Cynhyrchion Barddonol yr Hen Felinydd Owen Dafydd Cwmaman
Daniel Jenkins and David Lewis - Cerddi Cerngoch
Eluned Morgan - Dringo'r Andes
R. Silyn Roberts - Trystan ac Esyllt a Chaniadau Eraill

Music
Sir Henry Walford Davies - Everyman (oratorio)

Sport
Rugby league - In the first international league match, played between England and Other nationalities, ex-Wales rugby international Jack Rhapps becomes the World's first dual-code rugby international. 
Rugby union - Percy Bush scores 104 points for the British team on their tour of Australia and New Zealand.

Births
6 March - Hugh Williams, actor and dramatist (died 1969)
17 March - Daniel Granville West, Baron Granville-West, politician (died 1984)
12 April - David Jenkins, Wales national rugby footballer (died 1951)
18 May - Eynon Evans, actor and screenwriter (died 1989)
7 June - Tom Lewis, Wales international rugby player (died 1994)
8 June - Angus McBean, photographer (died 1990)
26 June
Prof Seaborne Davies, law teacher and three times President of the National Eisteddfod (died 1984)
Lynn Ungoed-Thomas, politician (died 1972)
27 June - Emrys Davies, cricketer (died 1975)
28 July - Ned Jenkins, Wales international rugby player (died 1990)
31 July - Harold Davies, Baron Davies of Leek, politician (died 1985)
4 August – Sir Thomas Parry, academic (died 1985)
8 August - Dai Parker, Wales and British Lion rugby player (died 1965)
22 August - Tommy Rees, Wales dual-code rugby player (died 1968)
12 September 
Euros Bowen, poet (died 1988)
Donald Holroyde Hey, chemist (died 1987)
24 September - George Andrews, Wales dual-code rugby player (died 1989)
27 September - John Gwilym Jones, dramatist (died 1988)
30 September - Waldo Williams, poet (died 1971)
10 October (in Somerset) – Leslie Morris, politician in Canada (died 1964) 
15 October - Sir Julian Hodge, banker (died 2004)
3 November - Caradog Prichard, poet and novelist (died 1980)
30 November - Philip Burton, theatre director and radio producer (died 1995)
date unknown - Richard Vaughan, novelist (died 1983)

Deaths
21 April - William Williams, businessman and politician, 64
10 May - Sir Henry Morton Stanley, journalist and explorer, 63
26 June - William Ormsby-Gore, 2nd Baron Harlech, 85
12 July – Samuel M. Jones, mayor of Toledo, Ohio, USA, 57
17 July - Isaac Roberts, astronomer, 75
25 July - James Valentine, English rugby international, 37 (struck by lightning while on holiday in Barmouth)
September - Benjamin Davies, Welsh-descended Canadian politician, 91
4 October - James Lewis Thomas, architect, 78
21 November - Jimmy Michael, cyclist, 27 (alcohol-related)
24 November - Lewis Jones, one of the founders of the Welsh settlement in Patagonia, 68
26 December - William Henry Powell, American Civil War hero, 79
29 December - Edward Treharne, Wales international rugby player, 42 (heart attack)

References

Years of the 20th century in Wales